Xeus or XEUS may refer to:
 XEUS, a space observatory plan developed by the European Space Agency
 Polestar Xeus, a solution from the South Korean software vendor NKIA for monitoring cloud systems
 Xeus, a vertical-landing, vertical-takeoff lunar lander demonstrator from Masten Space Systems